Dudinka is the name of several inhabited localities in Russia.

Urban localities
Dudinka, a town in Taymyrsky Dolgano-Nenetsky District of Krasnoyarsk Krai

Rural localities
Dudinka, Oryol Oblast, a village in Druzhensky Selsoviet of Dmitrovsky District of Oryol Oblast